Valentines From Matahari is the sixth studio album by American experimental rock band Sun City Girls, released in 1993 by Majora Records.

Track listing

Personnel
Adapted from the Valentines From Matahari liner notes.
Sun City Girls
 Alan Bishop – bass guitar
 Richard Bishop – guitar
 Charles Gocher – drums, percussion

Release history

References

External links 
 

1993 albums
Sun City Girls albums